The 2002 Taça de Angola was the 21st edition of the Taça de Angola, the second most important and the top knock-out football club competition following the Girabola. Petro de Luanda beat Desportivo da Huíla 3–0 in the final to secure its 8th title.

The winner qualified to the 2003 African Cup Winners' Cup.

Stadiums and locations

Championship bracket
The knockout rounds were played according to the following schedule:
 June 8 - preliminary rounds
 Jul 20 - 24: Round of 16
 Sep 8 - 12: Quarter-finals
 Nov 2–3: Semi-finals
 Nov 11: Final

Preliminary rounds

1/16 finals

Quarter-finals

Semi-finals

Final

See also
 2002 Girabola
 2003 Angola Super Cup
 2003 African Cup Winners' Cup
 Petro de Luanda players
 Desportivo da Huíla players

External links
 profile at rsssf.com

References

Angola Cup
2002 in Angolan football
Angola